Luis Milla Manzanares (born 7 October 1994) is a Spanish professional footballer who plays as a central midfielder for Getafe CF.

Club career

Early career
Born in Madrid, Milla joined Atlético Madrid's youth setup in June 2012, from CF Rayo Majadahonda. He made his senior debut with the C-team in Tercera División during the 2013–14 season, before being loaned out to fellow league team UD San Sebastián de los Reyes on 17 January 2014.

In July 2014, Milla signed for another reserve team, Rayo Vallecano B in Segunda División B. The following 7 August he signed for Segunda División side AD Alcorcón, being immediately loaned to CD Guijuelo in the third division for one year.

In September 2015, Milla suffered a severe knee injury, returning to action seven months later. On 17 July of the following year, he moved to fellow third division side CF Fuenlabrada also in a temporary deal.

On 11 July 2017, free agent Milla signed a permanent four-year contract with Fuenlabrada. On 28 November, he scored the opener in a 2–2 draw against Real Madrid at the Santiago Bernabéu Stadium, scoring in the stadium 24 years after his father's last goal.

Tenerife
On 19 January 2018, Milla signed a four-and-a-half-year contract with CD Tenerife in Segunda División. He made his professional debut nine days later, playing the full 90 minutes in a 0–0 home draw against Real Valladolid.

Milla scored his first professional goal on 27 October 2018, netting the equalizer in a 3–2 home win against AD Alcorcón. On 24 June 2020, he scored a brace in a 4–1 home routing of CD Mirandés.

Granada
On 31 July 2020, Milla signed a four-year contract with La Liga side Granada CF. On 12 September he marked his competitive debut for his new club and his first appearance in the top division of Spanish football by scoring a goal with a shot from the edge of the area, in a  2–0 victory over Athletic Bilbao.

Getafe
On 25 July 2022, after Granada's relegation, Milla signed a five-year deal with Getafe CF in the top tier.

Personal life
Milla's father, also named Luis, was also a footballer and a midfielder. A FC Barcelona youth graduate, he also represented Real Madrid, Valencia CF and the Spain national team before later working as a manager.

Career statistics

Club

References

External links

1994 births
Living people
Footballers from Madrid
Spanish footballers
Association football midfielders
La Liga players
Segunda División players
Segunda División B players
Tercera División players
Atlético Madrid C players
UD San Sebastián de los Reyes players
Rayo Vallecano B players
AD Alcorcón footballers
CD Guijuelo footballers
CF Fuenlabrada footballers
CD Tenerife players
Granada CF footballers
Getafe CF footballers